Alibek Sultanovich Delimkhanov (born October 16, 1974) is a Chechen Lieutenant Colonel, military commander of the Kadyrovtsy Spetsnaz battalion Sever (North), Hero of Russian Federation.

Sanctions 
In July 2022 the EU imposed sanctions on Alibek Delimkhanov in relation to the 2022 Russian invasion of Ukraine.

References 

1974 births
Living people
Chechen people
Heroes of the Russian Federation
21st-century Russian people